Interstitial granulomatous drug reaction is an uncommon, yet under-recognized, pattern of adverse reactions to medication.

See also 
Skin lesion

References 

Monocyte- and macrophage-related cutaneous conditions
Drug eruptions